Vitrina University was a private university founded in 2004 in Tirana, Albania according to the Court Decision no: 32.237. Its licence was revoked by the Albanian government in August 2014. The university had seven faculties, offered 41 programs, and was a member of the Balkan Universities Network.

Faculties 
 Architecture
 Economy and Tourism
 Educational Sciences
 Engineering
 Law
 Medicine
 Political Sciences

The languages of instruction at Vitrina University were Albanian, English and German. The study programs are compatible with the Bologna system. Thecampus, near the Tirana-Durrës highway, was 20.000 sq.m. It sheltered the Vitrina Formation and Professional Center with about 25 branches and the Vitrina High School with five branches of professional education and a full-time high school plus a part-time one.

Bachelor programs 
 Faculty of Law has a studying program of the first level, organized in three academic years with 180 credits. This studying program aims to provide students the basis professional knowledge in law. Civil Right/Trade Right/Penal Right/Administrative Right
 Faculty of Economy and Tourism aims to prepare skilled specialists in the field of Economy and Tourism. Finance-Banking / Business Management / Tourism Management / Public Administration
 Faculty of Political Sciences aims to graduate skilled specialists in the disciplines of Politics, to employ specialists in the public administration, political organs, in media, etj. Political Sciences / Journalism- Communication / International Relations
 Faculty of Medicine aims to provide full capabilities of reasoning and contemporary treatment of cases and problems, preparing students for a rewarding career in the field of Medicine. General Medicine / Nursing / Stomatology / Pharmacy
 Faculty of Engineering aims at providing qualified specialists in the field of Applied Electronic. Electronic Engineering / Informatics Engineering / Electrical Engineering / Engineering and Telecommunication/ Information and Communication Technology (ITC) / Mechatronics 
 Faculty of Education aims at providing qualified specialists in Education. Psychology / Sociology / Pre-School Teacher Education / English Language / Arabic Language and Literature 
 Faculty of Architecture aims to provide the future architects with the necessary knowledge related to the field of planning, projecting and maintenance of the construction and not only.  Architecture / Building Engineering

Master study programs 
Faculty of Economy: Master Science in Finance Banking and Professional Master in Managing and Marketing.
Faculty of Political Sciences: Master Science in Political Communication and Professional Master in Local and Executive *Administration.
Faculty of Justice: Master Science in the Civil and Trade Right Professional Master in Penal Right.
Faculty of Education Sciences: Master Science in Advising Psychology, Master Science in English Language Teaching, Professional Master in General Teaching, Professional Master in Managing the Education Institutions.

Master Science study programs 
Faculty of Medicine: Master Science in Public Health and Clinic Managing Master Science in Pharmacy and Master Science in Medicine.
Faculty of Engineering: Master Science in Electronic Engineering Professional Master in Informative Engineering Professional Master in Mechatronics 
Faculty of Architecture: Master Science in Architecture and Master Science in Building Engineering

Cooperation agreements 
Vitrina cooperates with more than 90 national and international partners on joint research, staff and student exchange, and training.

See the selected institutions with which the university cooperates:
 Uludag University of Bursa, Turkey 
 University of Şehır  in Istanbul, Turkey 
 Trakya University, in Edirne, Turkey 
 University of Zagreb, Croatia 
 University in Varaždin, Croatia 
 Ondokuz Mayıs University in Samsun, Turkey
 London South Bank University in London, England 
 University of Sarajevo in Bosnia and Herzegovina

See also
List of universities in Albania

External links
 Vitrina University official website

References 

Universities and colleges in Tirana
Educational institutions established in 2004
Universities in Albania
2004 establishments in Albania